Jefferson Alexandre Batista (born 23 February 1976 in São Paulo) is a retired Brazilian footballer.

Career
After playing in the youth teams of Corinthians, he represented the senior Brazilian clubs Pelotas, Mogi Mirim, Guarani, Vitória, Paulista and Coritiba. He also had a rich career abroad having played in Finland with FinnPa; Russia, with FC Alania Vladikavkaz and FC Uralan Elista; Switzerland, with FC St. Gallen, FC Zürich and Neuchâtel Xamax; Serbia, with FK Vojvodina; and China, with Nanjing Yoyo, Guangzhou Pharmaceutical and Zagen.

He began as a forward but gradually became an offensive midfielder.

After retiring, he became director of a sports management and marketing company.

Honours
 Paulista
Copa do Brasil: 2005

 Guangzhou
China League One: 2007

References

External sources
 
 Stats from Playerhistory

1976 births
Living people
Footballers from São Paulo
Brazilian footballers
Brazilian expatriate footballers
Association football midfielders
Association football forwards
Esporte Clube Pelotas players
Sport Club Corinthians Paulista players
Guarani FC players
Esporte Clube Vitória players
Mogi Mirim Esporte Clube players
Paulista Futebol Clube players
Coritiba Foot Ball Club players
Ituano FC players
Veikkausliiga players
FinnPa players
Kuopion Palloseura players
Expatriate footballers in Finland
FC Spartak Vladikavkaz players
FC Elista players
Russian Premier League players
Expatriate footballers in Russia
FC St. Gallen players
FC Zürich players
Neuchâtel Xamax FCS players
Swiss Super League players
Expatriate footballers in Switzerland
Nanjing Yoyo players
Guangzhou F.C. players
Expatriate footballers in China
China League One players
FK Vojvodina players
Expatriate footballers in Serbia